Nedjeftet is a queen mentioned on reliefs discovered near the pyramid complex of Pepi I (close to the pyramid complex of Queen Inenek-Inti). She was a wife of Pepi. Her name was also that of the 20th nome, later known as the Herakleopolis nome, in Upper Egypt; it is possible her family came from there and the marriage was to strengthen the king's position as opposed to the local lords.

Titles
Her titles were: Great one of the hetes-sceptre (wrt-ḥts), She who sees Horus and Seth (m33t-hrw-stsh), Great of Praises (wrt-ḥzwt), King’s Wife (ḥmt-niswt), King’s Wife, his beloved (ḥmt-niswt meryt.f), and Attendant of Horus (ḫt-ḥrw).

References

24th-century BC women
23rd-century BC women
Queens consort of the Sixth Dynasty of Egypt
Pepi I Meryre